Baba Haider Zaman (1934 – 24 October 2018) was a political personality of Hazara, Khyber Pakhtunkhwa, Pakistan. He was known for Hazara Province Movement, a protest campaign against changing the name of Sarhad Province. Baba joined Hazara Qumai mahaz on 17 January 2009 for supporting late Asif Malik cause of Hazara province.  In 2010, the whole political leadership of Hazara Division was united under his guidance and a demand of separate Hazara Province was strengthened by a division-wide protest. He was previously a Provincial Minister and District Nazim of Abbottabad.

Biography 
Haider Zaman Khan was born in the Dewal Manal village of Abbottabad District in 1934 to the Karlal tribe. He completed his FA in the 1950s and joined the Pakistan Air Force. After retirement, he entered politics in 1962 but failed to win a provincial seat. 

His first political win was when he got elected to the NWFP assembly from Abbottabad in 1985. The then chief minister Arbab Jehangir Khan appointed Zaman as the labour and human resource minister in his cabinet.

During his tenure as nazim he shot to prominence for opposing the renaming of the NWFP to Pakhtunkhwa. He criticised the President of Pakistan, Asif Ali Zardari, for referring to the province as Pakhtunkhwa - saying this was unconstitutional and done to please coalition partners.

Zaman said he was in contact with the nazims of the southern districts and all five nazims of the erstwhile Hazara Division opposed the name change. If the district was renamed in line with the proposal from the Awami National Party then, according to Zaman, a creation of a Hazara Province would be justified.

He was also involved in a petition against the provincial government of the NWFP claiming that they were curtailing the powers of district government. In March 2006, five months after a devastating earthquake struck the region, Zaman said repatriation of people from tent villages (set up in the aftermath of the earthquake) might be held up due to lack of resources possessed by the district governments. That year he also supported an initiative to raise awareness of the effects of the earthquake.

In 2007 he criticised Pakistani tour operators for the way they organised the Hajj and Umrah arrangements for pilgrims in Saudi Arabia, he also claimed that the tour operators were fleecing pilgrims and pilgrims were unable to get rid of greedy tour managers.

In 2010 following the renaming of the North-West Frontier Province, Khan has again been prominent by his opposition to the new name, he became the head of the Action Committee for Hazara province - he stated that the new name of the province is on an ethnic basis and so deprived the people of Hazara of their identity. In August 2010 Khan stated that the people of Hazara would stop payments of utility bills until their demands were met. He died on 24 October 2018.

See also 
 Hazara province movement

References 

1936 births
2018 deaths
Mayors of places in Pakistan
People from Abbottabad
Hindkowan people
Pakistan Muslim League (J) politicians